FuSe Pattern ( 拂色图 ) is a work
for solo piano, composed by He Xuntian in 1997.

Summary
He Xuntian adopted RD Composition and SS Composition in his work FuSe Pattern.

Inspiration
FuSe Pattern was inspired from Xuntian He's ideology:
Primordial music for all species.
Humanity’s first gift of sound to all species.
Making no distinction between ancient and modern ;
no distinction between north, south, east and west ;
no distinction between above and below, left and right ;
no distinction between primary and secondary positions ;
no distinction between beginning and end.

References

External links
FuSe Pattern published by Schott Musik International, Germany

Compositions for piano by He Xuntian
Compositions for solo piano
1997 compositions